This is a list of films which have placed number one at the weekend box office in Colombia during 2011.

References 

2011 in Colombia
Colombia